Let's Hope it Lasts or Pourvu que ça dure is a 1996 French comedy film, directed by Michel Thibaud.

Plot
Motorcyclists in the police, Jojo and Victor are inseparable in life and at work. One day, they must escort the deputy mayor of Nîmes, Jacques Dubreuil accompanied by a beautiful woman ...

Cast

 Ticky Holgado as Joseph Ponty
 Gérard Darmon as Victor Brulin
 Jean-Pierre Bisson as Jacques Dubreuil
 Catherine Jacob as Christine Ponty
 Emmanuelle Seigner as Julie Neyrac
 Didier Bénureau as Jean-Michel Pichon
 Rebecca Potok as Chastaing
 Maurice Illouz as Lulu
 Marc Betton as Gauthier
 Akonio Dolo as Michel
 Olivier Pajot as Bolzano
 Jean-Marie Cornille as Gérard
 Ariel Figueroa as Sébastien
 Ludovic Paris as Max

References

External links

1996 films
1990s French-language films
1996 comedy films
French comedy films
1990s French films